Waiting at the Royal is a 2000 Australian drama film directed by Glenda Hambly and starring Catherine McClements, Noni Hazlehurst, Josephine Byrnes and Jo Kennedy. It is about four women from very different backgrounds sharing a maternity ward.

Characters
 Dinny (played by Catherine McClements)
 Eloise (played by Noni Hazelhurst)
 Antoinette (played by Josephine Byrnes)
 Diana (played by Jo Kennedy)
 Saresh (played by Ramon Tikaram)
 Josie (played by Glynis Angell)
 Noel (played by Luke Elliot)

External links
Waiting at the Royal at the National Film and Sound Archive
 

Australian drama films
2000 films
2000 drama films
2000s English-language films
2000s Australian films